Hebrew Hammer may refer to:

In film
 The Hebrew Hammer, a 2003 film directed by Jonathan Kesselman

As a nickname

 Ryan Braun (b. 1983), American All Star baseball player
 Adam Edelman (b. 1991), American-born four-time Israeli National Champion in skeleton event, and Israeli Olympian
 Hank Greenberg (1911–1986), American Hall of Fame baseball player
 Andy Gruenebaum (b. 1982), American soccer player
 Gabe Kapler (b. 1975), American baseball player
 Al Rosen (1924-2015), American All Star baseball player
 Ido Pariente (b. 1978), Israeli mixed martial artist
 Dudi Sela (b. 1985), Israeli tennis player
 Cletus Seldin (b. 1986), American boxer